is a former Japanese football player who featured for Roasso Kumamoto.

Club statistics
Updated to 2 February 2018.

References

External links
Profile at Roasso Kumamoto 
Profile at Consadole Sapporo 

1988 births
Living people
Association football people from Kumamoto Prefecture
Japanese footballers
J1 League players
J2 League players
Hokkaido Consadole Sapporo players
Roasso Kumamoto players
Association football midfielders